The ivory-breasted pitta (Pitta maxima) is a species of bird in the family Pittidae. It is endemic to North Maluku in Indonesia, known as Paok halmahera. Its natural habitat is subtropical or tropical moist lowland forests.

Subspecies
Two subspecies are recognized:
Pitta maxima maxima – : It is the nominate subspecies, found on the islands of Halmahera, Bacan, Kasiruta, Obi, and possibly Mandioli.
Pitta maxima morotaiensis – : Found on the island of Morotai.

References

ivory-breasted pitta
Birds of the Maluku Islands
ivory-breasted pitta
Taxonomy articles created by Polbot